Metin Tokat (Batman, May 27, 1960 ) is a former Turkish association football referee who was active on the highest level in Europe between 1998 and 2003 and in Turkey between 1980 and 2006. He refereed international matches as well as matches in the Europa League and the Süper Lig. In his career, he refereed 305 matches.

International matches

References

See also 
List of association football referees

Turkish football referees
1960 births
Living people